"I Don't Love You Anymore" is a single by the American country music artist Charlie Louvin. Released in May 1964, it was the first single from his album Less and Less/I Don't Love You Anymore. In the US, it peaked at number 4 on the Billboard Hot Country Singles chart. It also reached number 1 on the RPM Country Tracks chart in Canada.

It was also covered by many other prominent country singers including Kitty Wells, Connie Smith, Norma Jean, George Jones and Carl Smith.

Chart performance

References

1964 singles
Charlie Louvin songs
Songs written by Bill Anderson (singer)
1964 songs